Wise, as a word, refers to someone with wisdom.

Wise may also refer to:

People
 Wise (surname)
 Wise (composer), also known as Wise da' Gangsta, a reggaeton producer/songwriter
 Wise (rapper) (born 1979), Japanese hip hop artist
 Wise (Stetsasonic), real name Leonardo Roman, a hip hop artist known as 'Wise' from the group 'Stetsasonic'
Rhett Wiseman, nicknamed "Wise" (born 1994), American professional baseball player

Places

United States
 Wise, North Carolina
 Wise, Virginia
 Wana, West Virginia, also known as Wise
 Wise County, Texas
 Wise County, Virginia
 Wise River, Montana
 Wise Township, Michigan

Businesses
Wise (company), a London-based financial services company
Wise Foods, Inc., a snack food manufacturer
Wise Solutions, an American software company that made the Wise software installation package
Wise Stores, a Canadian department store, mainly in Quebec

Other uses
 Wise, showing wisdom:  good judgement or the benefit of experience
 Wise Observatory, an astronomical observatory owned and operated by Tel Aviv University

See also 
 WISE (disambiguation)
 List of people known as the Wise
 Weis (disambiguation)
 Weiss (disambiguation)
 Weisz
 Weiz
 Wiseman (disambiguation)
 Wyse (disambiguation)